Frederick Victor Grey  Wymark (6 October 1872 – 19 October 1942) was an Australian Australiana collector, book collector and bookseller.

Biography

Wymark was born in Stawell, Victoria to a local Victorian mother and British father, he came to Sydney in 1884 and grew up in Wooloomooloo,  when David Angus opened a book store in Market Street, Sydney, Wymark became his assistant and was then apprenticed by Angus in 1890, Angus subsequently with his business partner established the retailer Angus & Robertson bookstores. After David Angus died in 1900, Wymark took over the majority share of the company with George Robertson. Wymark died in Church Point, New South Wales in 1942.

See also

 David Scott Mitchell
 Norman Alfred Williams Lindsay

References

Australian bibliophiles
Australian book and manuscript collectors
Australian booksellers
Australian people of English descent
1872 births
1942 deaths
People from Stawell, Victoria